Alagoa is a city in the Brazilian state of Minas Gerais. In 2020 its population was estimated to be 2,665.

Alagoa was founded on 28 December 1962.

Turned into a municipality in 1962, the village of Alagoa was born by the Bandeirantes in the 18th century. It was part of the "Royal Road" to move gold and precious gems (including diamonds) from the State of Minas Gerais to Rio de Janeiro and São Paulo seaports.

The municipality contains 5.38% of the  Serra do Papagaio State Park, created in 1998. On top of the Mantiqueira (The Crying Mountain, in the local Indians language) mountain range, it contains part of the most important remains of the Brazilian Atlantic Forest and fresh water drained from the mountains to the State of Minas Gerais valleys.

References

Municipalities in Minas Gerais